The Chapel of Luis de Lucena (Spanish: Capilla de Luis de Lucena o de las Urbinas) is a chapel located in Guadalajara, Spain. It was declared Bien de Interés Cultural in 1914.

References 

Bien de Interés Cultural landmarks in the Province of Guadalajara
Buildings and structures in Guadalajara, Spain